The Adventures of Hiram Holliday is an American adventure sitcom that aired on NBC from October 3, 1956 to February 27, 1957. Starring Wally Cox in the title role, the series is based on the 1939 novel of the same name by Paul Gallico.

Plot
The series is similar to the book, and focuses on the adventures of a newspaper proofreader who through years of secret practice has gained James Bond-like skills in many forms of physical combat, shooting, and in activities as diverse as rock climbing and scuba diving.  The proofreader, Hiram Holliday (Cox), was revealed to be muscular when stripped.

The starting gimmick of the series was that Holliday had inserted a comma in a news story which saved the publisher a small fortune in a trial. The grateful publisher rewarded Holliday with a trip around the world, which set the scene for him to solve crimes and thwart foreign spies in every port of call he visited. The series was hampered by a low budget which did not permit convincing recreations of the different exotic foreign locations featured in each episode.

Other cast members included actor Ainslie Pryor as Holliday's reporter sidekick, Joel Smith, and Sebastian Cabot as a criminal mastermind he repeatedly encountered.  There were a number of directors, including George Cahan and William Hole, and a number of writers, including Philip Rapp and Richard Powell. Rapp also served as producer.

Reception and cancellation
NBC canceled the series in early 1957 after 20 of the 23 episodes produced aired. The entire series later ran on the BBC from the fall of 1960 to the summer of 1961. In its BBC rerun, The Adventures of Hiram Holliday was the first US series to be shown five days a week in the same time slot.

Star Wally Cox was best known for portraying the title role in Mister Peepers, an early live NBC sitcom about a mild-mannered junior high school science teacher; it was typecasting he was never able to escape in later years. Hiram Holliday was Cox's last starring role.

Novel
The original novel was Gallico's first published book. It was published by Grosset and Dunlap on the cusp of World War II in 1939. In form, the novel is a connected series of adventures, rather akin to short stories which flow into one another.

In the book, Holliday was rewarded with time off and a cash reward which he used to go to Europe. In Europe he fights spies and Nazis, finds his true love (and has affairs with several other women), achieves some fame as a foreign correspondent with his newspaper back in New York, and becomes the man of action he aspired to be. The book has the major themes of the protagonist coming to grips with his own character and destiny, how individuals act when confronted by great evil, and the overarching question of would war come to Europe. The book encapsulates Gallico's views and insights at the time of writing, without the hindsight of later events - some of which turned out to be wrong and others were quite accurate.

George Ward notes that "It is very evident that the Hiram Holliday saga was written in the direct  aftermath of the Munich Agreement. It is clear where Gallico stood about Neville Chamberlain's policies of Appeasement. Holliday (and implicitly, Gallico) believes that the British have become soft and decadent, that they have lost the will to fight. The drunken debauched lord which Holliday sees in a night club is contrasted with the high ideals of Chivalry and the poetry of Chaucer(...) Where the British have been found wanting, a single plucky and quixotic American attempts to step into the breach".

The part set in Austria, in the direct aftermath of the Anschluss, depicts sullen Austrians who feel that their country had been invaded and occupied by unsavory foreigners. In this, Gallico - himself of partial Austrian origin - foreshadowed the doctrine of "Austria — the Nazis' first victim" which would become the political cornerstone of the post-war Second Austrian Republic. However,  Gallico seems to have expected a post-war Habsburg restoration  which failed to materialize.

External links
 
  
 The original novel
 The main characters

References

1956 American television series debuts
1957 American television series endings
1950s American sitcoms
American adventure television series
Black-and-white American television shows
English-language television shows
NBC original programming
Television shows based on American novels
Adaptations of works by Paul Gallico